The sandy blind mole-rat (Spalax arenarius) is an endangered species of rodent in the family Spalacidae. It is endemic to Ukraine. It was first identified by Evdokia Reshetnik in 1939.

Distribution and habitat 
It is restricted to a very small region of southern Ukraine, on sandy habitats along the lower Dnieper River on the Black Sea coastal plain. It inhabits moderately wet, sandy soils with low subterranean waters, in steppes dominated by absinth-grass or absinth-spurge, with sparse vegetation otherwise. It does not inhabit dry feathergrass steppe or moving sands.

Status 
Only about 15,000 to 20,000 mature individuals are thought to exist. The primary segment of the population inhabits the Black Sea Biosphere Reserve, and is thought to have a stable population trend. However, populations outside of this protected area are thought to be declining. The primary threat to this species is habitat conversion by the afforestation of the sandy soils for stabilization and wood production.

References

Spalax
Rodents of Europe
Endemic fauna of Ukraine
Mammals described in 1939
Taxonomy articles created by Polbot